Mala Novska Rujiška (Cyrillic: Мала Новска Рујишка) is a village in the municipality of Novi Grad, Republika Srpska, Bosnia and Herzegovina.

References

Populated places in Novi Grad, Bosnia and Herzegovina